The Arcade is an Australian nonprofit company that houses indie game developers in designated workspaces in order to foster a creative community "using game methodologies and technologies". They share property rent and are open to game testing each other's games to offer critique and support.

History
The company was established in 2013 in Melbourne. Tony Reed, president of the Game Developer's Association of Australia, came up with the idea in 2010. After being declined two times by the Australian government, they were given a chance to test it successfully, after which they were given funding from Film Victoria, as well as seed money from the GDAA. Part of the rationale is due to politician Joe Hockey cancelling the Interactive Media Fund, thereby taking $10 million out of the Australian video game industry.

As of 2016, the company hosts 33 video game studios from a small amount the previous year. The company moved to a new premises in South Melbourne in early 2017.

In March 2020 IGEA merged with GDAA, acquiring all assets including The Arcade. Key Arcade members Ceri Hutton and Sav Emmett Wolfe continue to run The Arcade whilst also assuming new roles within IGEA.

Culture
According to the Sydney Morning Herald, the company "offers discounted office space and hot desking, plus the significant benefits of shared knowledge and networking that come with working alongside others".

One of the devs explained: "I was working from home, going insane. I found out that this space was starting up...It’s been incredible. If I’ve got a question from a tech perspective...I can just go and talk to some of Australia’s foremost experts...That kind of expertise is just invaluable as a developer".

Companies 
It currently houses 33 Australian gaming development studios including:
 CG Spectrum
 Considerable Content
 DBolical
 Dime Studios
 Double Jump
 Fluffy Kitten Studios
 Game Developer's Association of Australia
 Goat Entertainment
 Grapple Gun Games
 Green Stripe Snake
 igda Melbourne
 Ironworks Games
 Log
 Lumi
 ManyMonkeys
 Mighty Games
 Minimega
 Mountains
 Points of Engagement
 Positomic
 Rocket Jump
 Samurai Punk
 Surprise Attack
 The Otherworld Agency
 The Voxel Agents
 Tin Man Games
 VectorStorm
 Wander
 Yak&Co

See also

List of companies of Australia

References

External links
 Good Game feature on The Arcade

Australian companies established in 2013
Video game publishers
Video game companies of Australia
Video game development companies
Video game companies established in 2013
Companies based in Melbourne